"Wag-Zak" is a song by South Korean girl group Lovelyz, released as the group's first non-album digital single. The single was released on July 1, 2018 by Woollim Entertainment and distributed by Kakao M (formerly LOEN Entertainment). Only seven members participated in this single as Jin was absent due to health issues.

Composition
"Wag-Zak" was written by Seo Ji-eum and composed by Razer (Strike), Hongdi, and Jaeripoteo. It was described by Billboard as vibrant tropical house beat song with a breezy melody that bounces along rhythmically towards its refreshing chorus and the sudden pronouncement of the titular phrase.

Background and release 
On June 21, Woollim Entertainment announced that Lovelyz would release their special digital single titled "Wag-Zak". It was also announced that Jin would not partake in the promotions due to health issues. Lovelyz performed "Wag-Zak" for the first time at Mnet's M Countdown on June 28, following in the various music program for a week. Their digital single "Wag-Zak" was released on July 1, complemented by a music video, marking their first summer release.

Music video 
The music video for "Wag-Zak" was released on July 1. The video shows the members of Lovelyz hanging out together on a resort, enjoying games, cocktails, water gun fights, and more. Jin did not appear in the music video due to health issues.

Track listing

Charts

Release history

References

Lovelyz songs
2018 singles
2018 songs